Adams Point is a neighborhood of Oakland, California.  It is located on the northern shore of Lake Merritt, directly adjacent to Downtown Oakland and the Grand Lake district. It is a triangle bounded by Grand Avenue on the south, Harrison Street on the northwest, and the MacArthur Freeway on the northeast. It lies at an elevation of 79 feet (24 m). Neighborhood landmarks include the Veteran's Memorial Building, the Earl Warren House, the art deco Bellevue-Staten Building, Lakeside Park, one of Oakland's larger parks, and Children's Fairyland, which is in the park.

History
The name Adams Point, and the short Adams Street, comes from the name of one of the early landowners in Oakland, Edson Adams. The area served as a camp for people displaced from San Francisco by the 1906 earthquake. Many of such displaced people remained in Oakland afterward, swelling its population.

Retail shops and services
Numerous ground floor retail businesses populate the Grand Ave business district which are within walking distance of the neighborhood.

City and county politics 
 it is in District 5 of Alameda County, California.

In 2022, the Oakland city approved a redistricting which occurs every 10 years; portions of Adam Point are in District 1 and District 3.

See also 
Lakeside Apartments District
Oakland City Center
Uptown Oakland

References

Neighborhoods in Oakland, California